The Four Seasons Hotel and Private Residences New Orleans is a historic 33-story, -tall skyscraper designed by noted architect Edward Durell Stone, located at 2 Canal Street in the Central Business District of New Orleans. It was formerly known as the "ITM Building", i.e., the International Trade Mart, it was also known as the World Trade Center New Orleans, and housed numerous foreign consulates and the headquarters for the Port of New Orleans.

The top floor hosted a cocktail lounge called "Top of the Mart" from the 1970s through 2001. The bar slowly rotated once per hour. After this, a bar called "360" (as in degrees) opened in its place, which remained until Hurricane Katrina in 2005. The World Trade Center closed in June 2011 and the building was purchased by the city of New Orleans.

In the years following the closure, various plans emerged. The “Save WTC NOLA” group campaigned for renovation rather than demolition, while others  campaigned to have the building demolished and have a park and landmark to the city built in its place.

The building was added to the National Register of Historic Places on June 9, 2014.

In 2018, work began to convert the structure to a Four Seasons Hotel, with 341 hotel rooms and 92 hotel-serviced condos on the top floors of the building. The conversion cost $450 million. In January 2021, its penthouse was sold for just under $13 million. The hotel opened on August 17, 2021.

See also
 List of tallest buildings in New Orleans
 Hotel Monteleone, which has a rotating bar

References

External links
Four Seasons Hotel New Orleans official website
Four Seasons Private Residences New Orleans official website
official Facebook page

Skyscraper office buildings in New Orleans
Buildings and structures with revolving restaurants
Edward Durell Stone buildings
Commercial buildings on the National Register of Historic Places in Louisiana
National Register of Historic Places in New Orleans
Office buildings completed in 1967
1967 establishments in Louisiana
Hotels established in 2021
Hotel buildings completed in 1967